Jovita Flores Fuentes (February 15, 1895 – August 7, 1978) was a Filipina soprano singer.

Background
She was born in Capiz (now Roxas City) to a well-off couple named Canuto and Dolores Fuentes. At an early age, she displayed interest in music, learning the contemporary songs at that time.

In 1917, she took up college at the University of the Philippines Conservatory of Music. In order to hone her skills further she pursued her studies abroad, going to Italy. In 1925, Fuentes made her debut as Cio-Cio-San in Puccini's Madame Butterfly, at the Teatro Municipale de Piacenza, another of her notable roles were of Mimi in La bohème, Pietro Mascagni's Iris and Richard Strauss' Salome. She later became an instructor upon her return.

Due to her merits and contributions in her field, she was dubbed as The First Lady of Philippine Music and in 1976 she earned the title of becoming the first female national artist in music.

Death
On August 7, 1978, two years after she received the recognition, she died at the age of 83.

Awards and recognitions
 Presidential Medal of Merit (1958)
 National Artist Award (1976)

References

Filipino sopranos
1895 births
1978 deaths
National Artists of the Philippines
People from Capiz
University of the Philippines alumni